Music to See is a Canadian music television program which aired on CBC Television from 1970 to 1979.

Premise
This classically oriented music series featured recitals recorded in various cities across Canada. The series featured both new and established musicians, with a broad range of styles presented.

Scheduling
This half-hour series was broadcast on Sunday afternoons throughout the 1970s as follows:

References

External links
 

CBC Television original programming
1970 Canadian television series debuts
1979 Canadian television series endings
1970s Canadian music television series